Dr. Fakhruddin Ahmed assumed the office of chief adviser (CA) to the non-party Caretaker government of Bangladesh on 11 January 2007 and chose thirteen advisers to form the government.

List of  Advisers (2008-9)

List of  Advisers (2007-8)

References

Cabinets of Bangladesh
Cabinets established in 2007